William Kuhlemeier (August 14, 1908 - July 8, 2001) was an American gymnast and Olympic medalist. He competed at the 1932 Summer Olympics in Los Angeles where he received a bronze medal in  clubs.

Kuhlemeier died on July 8, 2001 at the age of 93.

References

1908 births
2001 deaths
American male artistic gymnasts
Gymnasts at the 1932 Summer Olympics
Olympic bronze medalists for the United States in gymnastics
Medalists at the 1932 Summer Olympics
20th-century American people